Blind Ambition may refer to:

Blind Ambition, a book attributed to John Dean which was ghostwritten by Taylor Branch
Blind Ambition (miniseries), a 1979 TV miniseries based on the book about John Dean
 "Blind Ambition" (Brandy & Mr. Whiskers episode)
 "Blind Ambition" (Family Guy)", a television episode of Family Guy
 "Blind Ambitions", a television episode of The Golden Girls
Blind Ambition (documentary), 2021 BBC2 television documentary